Palk is a surname. Notable people with the surname include:

Anna Palk (1941–1990), English actress
Lawrence Palk, 1st Baron Haldon (1818–1883), British politician
Robert Palk (1717–1798), British priest and politician
Stan Palk (1921–2009), English footballer

See also
Pall (name)